Ribes bracteosum, the stink currant, is a species of currant native to western coastal North America from southeastern Alaska to Mendocino County in California.

The fruit, born in clusters, is dark blue with a whitish bloom, edible but sometimes unpleasant. Its habitats include stream banks, moist woods, shorelines and thickets.

References

External links

Plants of British Columbia: Ribes bracteosum
Jepson Flora Project: Ribes bracteosum

bracteosum
Flora of the West Coast of the United States
Flora of British Columbia
Plants described in 1832
Flora of Alaska
Flora without expected TNC conservation status